In mathematics, more specifically in the theory of Monte Carlo methods, variance reduction is a procedure used to increase the precision of the estimates obtained for a given simulation or computational effort.  Every output random variable from the simulation is associated with a variance which limits the precision of the simulation results. In order to make a simulation statistically efficient, i.e., to obtain a greater precision and smaller confidence intervals for the output random variable of interest, variance reduction techniques can be used. The main ones are common random numbers, antithetic variates, control variates, importance sampling, stratified sampling, moment matching, conditional Monte Carlo and quasi random variables. For simulation with black-box models subset simulation and line sampling can also be used. Under these headings are a variety of specialized techniques; for example, particle transport simulations make extensive use of "weight windows" and "splitting/Russian roulette" techniques, which are a form of importance sampling.

Crude Monte Carlo simulation
Suppose one wants to compute  with the random variable  defined on the probability space . Monte Carlo does this by sampling i.i.d. copies  of
 and then to estimate  via the sample-mean estimator

Common Random Numbers (CRN)

The common random numbers variance reduction technique is a popular and useful variance reduction technique which applies when we are comparing two or more alternative configurations (of a system) instead of investigating a single configuration. CRN has also been called correlated sampling, matched streams or matched pairs.

CRN requires synchronization of the random number streams, which ensures that in addition to using the same random numbers to simulate all configurations, a specific random number used for a specific purpose in one configuration is used for exactly the same purpose in all other configurations.  For example, in queueing theory, if we are comparing two different configurations of tellers in a bank, we would want the (random) time of arrival of the N-th customer to be generated using the same draw from a random number stream for both configurations.

Underlying principle of the CRN technique

We want to estimate

If we perform n replications of each configuration and let

And since the 's are independent identically distributed random variables,

In case of independent sampling, i.e., no common random numbers used then Cov(X1j, X2j) = 0. But if we succeed to induce an element of positive correlation between X1 and X2 such that Cov(X1j, X2j) > 0, it can be seen from the equation above that the variance is reduced.

It can also be observed that if the CRN induces a negative correlation, i.e., Cov(X1j, X2j) < 0, this technique can actually backfire, where the variance is increased and not decreased (as intended).

See also
Explained variance

References

MCNP — A General Monte Carlo N-Particle Transport Code, Version 5  Los Alamos Report LA-UR-03-1987

 
Monte Carlo methods